The 1978 All-Ireland Senior Ladies' Football Championship Final was the fifth All-Ireland Final and the deciding match of the 1978 All-Ireland Senior Ladies' Football Championship, an inter-county ladies' Gaelic football tournament for the top teams in Ireland.

The wet conditions didn't suit Roscommon's speedy players, but they won anyway.

Madeline Treacy and Triona Moran scored the goals. Liz O'Brien pitched in with two points. Mary Shield registered Roscommon's remaining score.

References

Ladies}
All-Ireland Senior Ladies' Football Championship Finals
Roscommon county ladies' football team matches
Tipperary county ladies' football team matches
All-Ireland